Springdale is a historic home located at Crozier, Goochland County, Virginia.  The original section was built about 1800.  It is a two-story, three bay, Federal period brick farmhouse with a frame addition.  It is one of the few documented one-over-one-over-one houses in Goochland County.

It was listed on the National Register of Historic Places in 2002.

References

Houses on the National Register of Historic Places in Virginia
Federal architecture in Virginia
Colonial Revival architecture in Virginia
Houses completed in 1800
Houses in Goochland County, Virginia
National Register of Historic Places in Goochland County, Virginia